Three-Piece Reclining Figure No. 2: Bridge Prop is a sculpture by Henry Moore, created in 1963, and produced in an edition of six copies.

Locations
Casts include:

 The Tate Modern in London 
 The Henry Moore Foundation in their sculpture garden around his old house at Perry Green, Hertfordshire (on loan from Leeds Museums and Galleries) 
 David Winton Bell Gallery in Providence, Rhode Island. Installed in 1963 on the main campus green at Brown University. It is catalogued as LH513.
 The Hirshhorn Museum and Sculpture Garden in Washington, D.C.

History
According to the Henry Moore Foundation: 

Moore himself said:

See also
List of sculptures by Henry Moore
List of public art in Washington, D.C., Ward 2

References

External links
Waymarking
DC Memorials

Sculptures by Henry Moore
1963 sculptures
Modernist sculpture
Hirshhorn Museum and Sculpture Garden
Sculptures of the Smithsonian Institution
Abstract sculptures in Washington, D.C.
Bronze sculptures in Washington, D.C.
Outdoor sculptures in Washington, D.C.
Bronze sculptures in Rhode Island
Bronze sculptures in the United Kingdom